Alvocidib (INN; also known as flavopiridol) is a flavonoid alkaloid CDK9 kinase inhibitor under clinical development by Tolero Pharmaceuticals for the treatment of acute myeloid leukemia. It has been studied also for the treatment of arthritis and atherosclerotic plaque formation. The target of alvocidib is the positive transcription elongation factor P-TEFb.   Treatment of cells with alvocidib leads to inhibition of P-TEFb and the loss of mRNA production.

The compound is a synthetic analog of natural product rohitukine which was initially extracted from Aphanamixis polystachya (formerly Amoora rohituka, hence the name) and later from Dysoxylum binectariferum.

Orphan drug
The FDA has granted orphan drug designation to alvocidib for the treatment of patients with acute myeloid leukemia.

References

Experimental cancer drugs
Chromones
Protein kinase inhibitors
Orphan drugs